Hank Worden (born Norton Earl Worden; July 23, 1901 – December 6, 1992) was an American cowboy-turned-character actor who appeared in many Westerns, including many John Ford films such as The Searchers and the TV series The Lone Ranger.

Biography
Born in Rolfe, Iowa, Worden was raised on a cattle ranch near Glendive, Montana and was educated at Stanford University and the University of Nevada as an engineer. He enlisted in the U.S. Army hoping to become an Army pilot, but failed to pass flight school. An expert horseman, he toured the country in rodeos as a saddle bronc rider. During one ride, his horse landed atop him and fractured his neck, but aside from a temporary soreness, Worden did not know of the nature of the damage until x-rayed 20 years later. While appearing in a rodeo at Madison Square Garden in New York, he and fellow cowboy Tex Ritter were chosen to appear in the Broadway play Green Grow the Lilacs (1931). Following the run of the play, Worden drove a cab in New York City, and then worked on dude ranches as a wrangler and as a guide on the Bright Angel trail of the Grand Canyon.

A chance encounter with actress Billie Burke at a dude ranch led her to recommend him to several film producers. Worden made his film debut as an extra in Cecil B. DeMille's The Plainsman (though a few later films were released prior to The Plainsman). By this time, Tex Ritter had become a star, and Worden played sidekick roles in a number of Ritter's Westerns. In several of his early appearances, Worden was billed as "Heber Snow", until he reverted to his real name. A small part in Howard Hawks's Come and Get It led to a number of later appearances for that director, who also recommended him to director John Ford. He appeared in six episodes of the TV series The Lone Ranger.

Worden eventually became a member of the John Ford Stock Company, and was directed by Ford twelve times in films and television. The connection with Ford led to an association with actor John Wayne, and Worden appeared in 17 of Wayne's films. Foremost among his collaborations with Wayne and Ford in The Searchers, the 1956 classic Western in which Worden portrayed his most memorable role, that of "Mose Harper," the Shakespearean fool who only longed for "a roof over [his] head and a rocking chair by the fire."

Worden's best performances were given for demanding directors. He had a striking appearance: tall, thin, bald, his voice and mannerisms unforgettable to anyone who saw him. He worked steadily in television as well as films, long outliving Hawks, Ford and Wayne, and achieving some late notice as a senile hotel waiter in David Lynch's Twin Peaks TV series.

In 1992, Worden hosted and co-produced, with director Clyde Lucas, an independent special shown on the Nostalgia Channel and some PBS stations entitled Thank Ya, Thank Ya Kindly. The special looked back on Worden's career and featured guests Clint Eastwood, Paul Hogan, Harry Carey Jr., Ben Johnson, Frankie Avalon, Burt Kennedy and stuntman Dean Smith.

Widowed by his wife of 37 years (the former Emma Louise Eaton) in 1977, he later shared his house for several years with actor Jim Beaver. He died while taking a nap at his home in Los Angeles on December 6, 1992, aged 91. He was survived by his daughter, Dawn Henry, whom he and his wife had adopted as an adult.

Selected filmography

John Wayne films

 Stagecoach (1939) as Cavalryman extra (uncredited)
 The Night Riders (1939) as Rancher (uncredited)
 A Lady Takes a Chance (1943) as Walter (uncredited)
 Angel and the Badman (1947) as Townsman (uncredited)
 Fort Apache (1948) as Southern Recruit
 Red River (1948) as Sims Reeves
 3 Godfathers (1948) as Deputy Curly
 The Fighting Kentuckian (1949) as Abner Todd (uncredited)
 The Quiet Man (1952) as Trainer in flashback (uncredited)
 The Searchers (1956) as Mose Harper
 The Horse Soldiers (1959) as Deacon Clump
 The Alamo (1960) as Parson
 McLintock! (1963) as Curly Fletcher
 True Grit (1969) as R. Ryan - Undertaker (uncredited) 
 Chisum (1970) as Elwood - Stationmaster
 Rio Lobo (1970) as Hank - Hotel Clerk (uncredited)
 Big Jake (1971) as Hank
 Cahill U.S. Marshal (1973) as Albert

Other appearances

 Barbary Coast (1935) as Barfly / Townsman (uncredited)
 For the Service (1936) as Henchman (uncredited)
 Ghost-Town Gold (1936) as Mr. Crabtree (uncredited)
 Come and Get It (1936) as Lumberjack (uncredited)
 The Plainsman (1936) as Deadwood Townsman (uncredited)
 Trouble in Texas (1937) as Hank a Dancer (uncredited)
 Hittin' the Trail (1937) as Sidekick Hank
 Sing, Cowboy, Sing (1937) as Henchman
 Riders of the Rockie (1937) as Henchman (uncredited)
 Riders of the Dawn (1937) as Deputy (uncredited)
 The Californian (1937) as Ruiz Man (uncredited)
 The Mystery of the Hooded Horsemen (1937) as Deputy
 Moonlight on the Range (1937) as Ranch Hand (uncredited)
 Hollywood Round-Up (1937) as Saloon Set Extra (uncredited)
 Boss of Lonely Valley (1937) as Hank - Wagon Driver (uncredited)
 Tex Rides with the Boy Scouts (1937) as Henchman (uncredited)
 Sudden Bill Dorn (1937) as Barfly (uncredited)
 The Singing Outlaw (1937) as Bixby Cowhand (uncredited)
 Frontier Town (1938) as Henchman Buck (uncredited)
 The Last Stand (1938) as Rustler Playing Fiddle at Campfire (uncredited)
 Western Trails (1938) as Townsman (uncredited)
 Flaming Frontiers (1938) as Henchman [Ch. 11] (uncredited)
 Rollin' Plains (1938) as Henchman Squint (uncredited)
 The Stranger from Arizona (1938) as Skeeter
 Where the Buffalo Roam (1938) as Man at Dance (uncredited)
 The Cowboy and the Lady (1938) as Cowhand Leonard (uncredited)
 Ghost Town Riders (1938) as Tom 'Cherokee' Walton
 Sundown on the Prairie (1939) as Henchman Hank
 Rollin' Westward (1939) as Slim Regan
 Timber Stampede (1939) as Photographer (uncredited)
 Oklahoma Frontier (1939) as Townsman (uncredited)
 Chip of the Flying U (1939) as Cowhand (uncredited)
 Reno (1939) as Townsman (uncredited)
 Northwest Passage (1940) as Ranger Tying Oars (uncredited)
 Viva Cisco Kid (1940) as Deputy (uncredited)
 Rancho Grande (1940) as Cowhand (uncredited)
 Riders of Pasco Basin (1940) as Townsman (uncredited)
 Shooting High (1940) as Townsman (uncredited)
 Beyond Tomorrow (1940) as Hospital Visitor (uncredited)
 Gaucho Serenade (1940) as Farmer Driving Jalopy (uncredited)
 Prairie Law (1940) as Jacobs - Homesteader (uncredited)
 Winners of the West (1940) as Drunk [Chs. 3, 5] (uncredited)
 Cross-Country Romance (1940) as Wedding Witness (uncredited)
 The Range Busters (1940) as Cowhand (uncredited)
 Brigham Young (1940) as Mormon Cheering Porter (uncredited)
 Ride, Tenderfoot, Ride (1940) as Henry Haggerty (uncredited)
 Triple Justice (1940) as Townsman Outside Saloon (uncredited)
 Ride, Kelly, Ride (1941) as Slim (uncredited)
 Robbers of the Range (1941) as Stagecoach Attendant (uncredited)
 Border Vigilantes (1941) as Aunt Jennifer's Wagon Driver (uncredited)
 Last of the Duanes (1941) as Loafer (uncredited)
 Dude Cowboy (1941) as Man with Toothache (uncredited)
 Code of the Outlaw (1942) as Expectant Father (uncredited)
 Cowboy Serenade (1942) as Opie (uncredited)
 Riding the Wind (1942) as Duff Bricker
 Just Off Broadway (1942) as Comedian in Wings (uncredited)
 Deep in the Heart of Texas (1942) as Townsman (uncredited)
 Tenting Tonight on the Old Camp Ground (1943) as Sleepy Martin
 Black Market Rustlers (1943) as Slim
 So Proudly We Hail! (1943) as Soldier on Troop Ship (uncredited)
 Flesh and Fantasy (1943) as Circus Spectator (uncredited)
 Jack London (1943) as New Year's Eve Party Guest (uncredited)
 Canyon City (1943) as Barfly (uncredited)
 The Woman of the Town (1943) as The Barber (uncredited)
 None Shall Escape (1944) as German Motorcycle Soldier (uncredited)
 Rationing (1944) as Man at Wedding (uncredited)
 Wyoming Hurricane (1944) as Cowboy (uncredited)
 Lumberjack (1944) as Lumberjack (uncredited)
 The Great Moment (1944) as Morton's Sign Painter - replaced Roscoe Ates (uncredited)
 National Barn Dance (1944) as Farmer at Barn Dance (uncredited)
 The Bullfighters (1945) as Mr. McCoy (uncredited)
 Abbott and Costello in Hollywood (1945) as Joe (uncredited)
 Frontier Gunlaw (1946) as Pete (uncredited)
 Lawless Breed (1946) as The Deputy
 The Missing Lady (1946) as Flophouse Bum (uncredited)
 Undercurrent (1946) as Telegram Delivery Man (uncredited)
 Duel in the Sun (1946) as Dance- Floor Cowboy (uncredited)
 The Shocking Miss Pilgrim (1947) as Office Clerk (uncredited)
 The Sea of Grass (1947) as Bill - Salt Fork Townsman (uncredited)
 The Secret Life of Walter Mitty (1947) as Minor Role (uncredited)
 Prairie Express (1947) as Deputy Clint
 High Wall (1947) as Diner Customer (uncredited)
 Slippy McGee (1948) as Station Wagon Driver (uncredited)
 The Man from Texas (1948) as Churchgoer (uncredited)
 Lightnin' in the Forest (1948) as Bartender
 The Sainted Sisters (1948) as Taub Beasley
 Hazard (1948) as Man in Cheap Hotel (uncredited)
 Feudin', Fussin' and A-Fightin' (1948) as Clem (uncredited)
 Tap Roots (1948) as Cropper (uncredited)
 Whispering Smith (1948) as Murray's Ranchhand (uncredited)
 Yellow Sky (1948) as Rancher, Bank Customer (uncredited)
 Cover Up (1949) as Undertaker (credited as "Wordon Norton"]
 Red Canyon (1949) as Charley (uncredited)
 Streets of Laredo (1949) as Texas Ranger (uncredited)
 Hellfire (1949) as Witness (uncredited)
 Roseanna McCoy (1949) as Jacob (uncredited)
 When Willie Comes Marching Home (1950) as American Legionnaire Band Leader (uncredited)
 Father Is a Bachelor (1950) as Finnegan (uncredited)
 Wagon Master (1950) as Luke Clegg
 Curtain Call at Cactus Creek (1950) as Townsman
 Frenchie (1950) as Mr. Grady (uncredited)
 Sugarfoot (1951) as Johnny-Behind-the-Stove
 Comin' Round the Mountain (1951) as Target Judge
 Joe Palooka in Triple Cross (1951) as Hard-of-Hearing Farmer
 The Man with a Cloak (1951) as First Carriage Driver (uncredited)
 Boots Malone (1952) as Gas Station Mechanic (uncredited)
 Woman of the North Country (1952) as Tom Gordon
 The Big Sky (1952) as Poordevil
 Apache War Smoke (1952) as Amber
 Sky Full of Moon (1952) as Cowhand (uncredited)
 The Lawless Breed (1953) as Kansas City Barfly (uncredited)
 Ma and Pa Kettle on Vacation (1953) (uncredited)
 Powder River (1953) as Joe (uncredited)
 Crime Wave (1953) as Sweeney (uncredited)
 Ma and Pa Kettle at Home (1954) as Indian (uncredited)
 The Outcast (1954) as Bartender (uncredited)
 Davy Crockett, King of the Wild Frontier (1955) as Cave bar patron (uncredited)
 The Road to Denver (1955) as Shad Ewing, Livery Stable Owner (uncredited)
 The Vanishing American (1955) as Shoie (uncredited)
 The Indian Fighter (1955) as Crazy Bear / Guardhouse Keeper
 Davy Crockett and the River Pirates (1956) as Fiddler (archive footage)
 Meet Me in Las Vegas (1956) as Joe (uncredited)
 Thunder Over Arizona (1956) as Old Jonas (uncredited)
 Accused of Murder (1956) as Les Fuller
 The Quiet Gun (1957) as Sampson
 Spoilers of the Forest (1957) as Pat Casey
 Dragoon Wells Massacre (1957) as Hopi Charlie
 The Buckskin Lady (1957) as Lon
 Forty Guns (1957) as Marshal John Chisum
 Sing, Boy, Sing (1958) as Girl's Father at Police Station (uncredited)
 The Notorious Mr. Monks (1958) as Pete
 Toughest Gun in Tombstone (1958) as Liveryman (uncredited)
 Bullwhip (1958) as Tex
 Wild Heritage (1958) as Trail Drive Cowhand (uncredited)
 Sergeant Rutledge (1960) as Laredo (uncredited)
 One-Eyed Jacks (1961) as Doc
 The Music Man (1962) as Undertaker (uncredited)
 Good Times (1967) as Kid
 The President's Analyst (1967) as Dirty Old Man (uncredited)
 Big Daddy (1969)
 Zachariah (1971) as Old Cowboy (uncredited)
 Bedknobs and Broomsticks (1971) as Old Home Guardsman (uncredited)
 Black Noon (1971, TV Movie) as Joseph
 Eve of Aunt Agnes (1974)
 The Legend of Frank Woods (1977) as Slim
 Smokey and the Bandit (1977) as Trucker with harmonica (uncredited)
 Which Way Is Up? (1977) as The Flunky
 Big Wednesday (1978) as Shopping Cart 
 Sgt. Pepper's Lonely Hearts Club Band (1978) as Old Lonely Hearts Club Band
 They Went That-A-Way & That-A-Way (1978) as Butch Collins
 Every Which Way But Loose (1978) as Trailer Court Manager
 Bronco Billy (1980) as Station Mechanic 
 Scream (1981) as John
 Soggy Bottom, U.S.A. (1981) as Old Geezer
 Hammett (1982) as Pool Room Attendant
 Flush (1982)
 Island Fury (1983) as Gramps Jebediah
 The Ice Pirates (1984) as Elderly Jason
 UFOria (1985) as Colonel
 Runaway Train (1985) as Old Con 
 Space Rage (1985) as Old codger
 Once Upon a Texas Train (1988, TV Movie) as Old Timer
 Big Bad John (1990) as Good Ole Boy
 Almost an Angel (1990) as Pop, Patient in Hospital

Television
The Lone Ranger - episode - The Tenderfeet (1949) as Rusty Bates
The Lone Ranger - episode - Woman from Omaha (1953) as Whip
The Lone Ranger - episode - The Ghost of Coyote Canyon (1953) as Ed 
The Lone Ranger - episode - Stage to Tishomingo (1954) as Ike Beatty, Stage driver
The Lone Ranger - episode - The Bait: Gold! (1955) as  Jud, Stagecoach Driver
The Lone Ranger - episode - The Banker's Son (1957) as Bruckner
Rawhide - episode - Incident of the Devil and His Due (1960) as Joe Wendell
Wagon Train - episode -  The Colter Craven Story (1960) as Hank (uncredited)
Wagon Train - episode -  The Nellie Jefferson Story (1961) as Trader
Bonanza - episode - The Stranger (1960) as  Station Attendant
Bonanza - episode - The Bride (1961) as Ned Birch (Old Miner)
Bonanza - episode - Tommy (1966) as Dave (uncredited)
Hondo and the Apaches - TV movie (1967) as One of Gallagher's Mine Workers (uncredited)
Hondo - episode - Hondo and the Eagle Claw (1967) as Miner (uncredited)
Hondo - episode - Hondo and the War Cry (1967) as Miner (uncredited)
McCloud - episode - A Little Plot at Tranquil Valley (1972) as Elderly Patient (uncredited)
Gunsmoke - episode - The Tarnished Bridge (1974) as Claude
The Yellow Rose - episode - A Question of Love (1983) as Old Man
Knight Rider - episode - Fright Knight (1985) as Slim
Twin Peaks (1990-1991) as Waiter (Final Role)

References

External links
 
 Hank Worden Website
 
 Thank Ya, Thank Ya Kindly IMDB
 Thank Ya Kindly Documentary

1901 births
1992 deaths
American male film actors
Male actors from Iowa
Male actors from Montana
People from Pocahontas County, Iowa
Male Western (genre) film actors
Burials at Forest Lawn Memorial Park (Glendale)
20th-century American male actors
People from Glendive, Montana
Military personnel from Montana
Saddle bronc riders